Willy Hagara (4 June 1927 – 15 May 2015) was an Austrian schlager pop singer and actor.

Born in Vienna, he worked for the Austrian postal service before winning a talent competition in the Vienna Konzerthaus in 1946.  Credited at the time as "the best jazz singer in Vienna", he took singing and acting lessons and began a career as a popular baritone singer and entertainer.  His song "Casetta in Canada" reached number 3 on the German pop chart in 1958.  He made numerous television appearances, and appeared in popular West German films such as Weißer Holunder, Der Haus-Tyrann, and Paprika.

He largely gave up his career in entertainment in the late 1960s after the deaths of both his wife and father, from whom he received a large inheritance.  He lived quietly in retirement, and made his final public appearance in 2002.  He died in 2015, aged 87.

References

External links
 Willy Hagara at IMDb

1927 births
2015 deaths